Çüngüş is a district of Diyarbakır Province of Turkey. According to Turkish government statistics, its population is 11,927 as of 2018.

Çüngüş was an Armenian bishopric an Armenian Church was constructed in 1841. Besides the church a monastery was located. In 1915, Çüngüş was the site of a massacre during the Armenian genocide in which around 10,000 Armenians living in the area were taken to the Dudan crevasse and murdered by being thrown into the chasm. The massacre was remembered and recorded by the local Kurdish population, and a memorial to victims of the killings was recorded in the film 100 Years Later (2016).

References

Kurdish settlements in Turkey
Populated places in Diyarbakır Province
Populated places on the Euphrates River
Districts of Diyarbakır Province